The Triumph 13/35 or 12.8 is a[car manufactured from 1924 until 1926 by the Triumph Motor Company in the UK.

It was powered by a four-cylinder  engine of 72 mm bore and 115 mm stroke with single Zenith carburettor which produced  .

It was the first British production car to be fitted with hydraulic brakes on all wheels. These were made by Lockheed and were of the external contracting type.

Approximately 2500 of this model and the parallel 15/50 models were made.  It was generally priced at about £375 to 495.

References
Graham Robson The  Triumph Sports Cars  Motor Racing Publications 1972. 
Nick Baldwin A-Z of cars of the 1920s  Bay View Books. 1994

External links
Pre-1940 Triumph Owners Club
Club Triumph - Triumph's 75th anniversary

13 35
Cars introduced in 1924